The Party for Full Democracy, abbreviated to PID, is a political party in Luxembourg.  It was founded in 2013 by Jean Colombera, a member of the Chamber of Deputies that had been elected for the Alternative Democratic Reform Party at the 2009 election.  The party ran in the 2013 election, with Colombera leading the list in Nord, but did not win any seats.

References

2013 establishments in Luxembourg
Conservative parties in Luxembourg
Political parties established in 2013